State Route 85 (SR 85) is an east-west state highway in Middle Tennessee. The -long road traverses portions of Smith, Jackson, Overton, and Fentress Counties.

Route description

SR 85 begins in Smith County in Monoville at a junction with SR 80. It goes east as a primary highway to an intersection with SR 263 before passing by Cordell Hull Lake/Cumberland River. It then passes through Defeated and travels along Defeated Creek for a short distance before turning east again and passing through Kempville.

SR 85 then enters Jackson County and passes by the historic home of Sampson Williams. It then climbs a few mountains before coming to a junction and becomes concurrent with SR 262 at a crossing of an arm of Cordell Hull Lake. They then parallel the Cumberland River until SR 85 separates from SR 262 and turns north. SR 85 then becomes a very curvy secondary highway and turns northeast as it climbs through some more mountains for several miles. It then intersects SR 56/SR 135 in Jennings Creek and joins their concurrency, becoming primary once again. They then turn south and pass by Jackson County Middle School before crossing the Cumberland River again and intersecting with SR 53 just north of Gainesboro. SR 56 turns south along SR 53 while SR 85 and SR 135 turn north along SR 53. The three travel along the banks of the Cumberland River before they all split at a W-shaped intersection, with SR 53 turning north along the Cumberland, SR 135 goes southeast, and SR 85 east, leaving the Cumberland River for the final time. SR 85 then goes through some more mountains before passing through Burristown and some farmland. It then becomes curvy again and crosses into Overton County.

It then enters Hillham and intersects SR 136. SR 85 then curves to the southeast and leaves Hilham, passing by Hilham School. It the continues east to intersect SR 84 before entering Livingston. It the intersects and becomes concurrent with SR 111 for a short distance before entering downtown. In downtown, SR 85 intersects and becomes concurrent with SR 52. They then leave downtown and intersect SR 294 before leaving Livingston. SR 52/SR 85 then become curvy and pass through Alpine. SR 52 then separates and turns north, while SR 85 turns south, becoming secondary once again. It then passes through Allred it then becomes extremely curvy and climbs a very large mountain to junction with SR 164 north of Crawford. It stays curvy for several more miles to pass through Twinton, where it meets Craventown Road, which to the Wilder community just to the north, before the road crosses into Fentress County.

SR 85 then goes through Davidson (where it passes by the Wilder post office) and some hairpin turns before the road finally straightens out as it enters farmland, coming to an end shortly thereafter at US 127/SR 28 between Clarkrange and Grimsley beside South Fentress Elementary School.

Major intersections

See also

References 
 

085 
085 
085 
085 
085